This is a list of all United States Supreme Court cases from volume 409 of the United States Reports:

External links

1972 in United States case law
1973 in United States case law